János Urányi (24 June 1924 - 23 May 1964) was a Hungarian sprint canoer.

Urányi was born in Balatonboglár and competed from the late 1940s to the late 1950s. Competing in three Summer Olympics, he won a gold medal in the K-2 10000 m event at Melbourne in 1956.

Urányi also won two medals at the ICF Canoe Sprint World Championships with a gold (K-2 10000 m: 1958) and a bronze (K-4 10000 m: 1954).

He died in Budapest, aged 39.

References

1924 births
1964 deaths
People from Balatonboglár
Canoeists at the 1948 Summer Olympics
Canoeists at the 1952 Summer Olympics
Canoeists at the 1956 Summer Olympics
Hungarian male canoeists
Olympic canoeists of Hungary
Olympic gold medalists for Hungary
Olympic medalists in canoeing
ICF Canoe Sprint World Championships medalists in kayak
Medalists at the 1956 Summer Olympics
Sportspeople from Somogy County
20th-century Hungarian people